Ebermannsdorf is a municipality in the district of Amberg-Sulzbach in Bavaria in Germany.

History 
Eppo von Ebermannsdorf was first mentioned in 1079.

References

Amberg-Sulzbach